The men's C-2 200 metres competition at the 2018 ICF Canoe Sprint World Championships in Montemor-o-Velho took place at the Centro de Alto Rendimento de Montemor-o-Velho.

Schedule
The schedule was as follows:

All times are Western European Summer Time (UTC+1)

Results
With fewer than ten competitors entered, this event was held as a direct final.

References

ICF